General's Son II, also known as The General's Son II or Son of a General II, is a 1991 South Korean crime film directed by Im Kwon-taek. The second film in Im's General's Son trilogy, it stars Park Sang-min as Kim Du-han, a gangster during the Japanese occupation of Korea.

Cast
 Park Sang-min as Kim Du-han
 Lee Il-jae	
 Song Chae-hwan
 Shin Hyun-joon
 Bae Mi-hyang

Release
General's Son II was one of the top 10 highest-grossing films in Seoul in 1992.

References

External links
 
 Janggunui Adeul II at the Complete Index to World Film

1991 films
1990s crime action films
1991 crime drama films
South Korean crime action films
South Korean crime drama films
South Korean neo-noir films
Films about organized crime in Korea
Films directed by Im Kwon-taek
1990s Korean-language films
South Korean sequel films
Films set in Korea under Japanese rule
South Korean films based on actual events